Lakshyam ( Target) is a 2007 Indian Telugu-language action film produced by Nallamalupu Srinivas (Bujji) on Sri Lakshmi Narasimha Productions and directed by Srivass. It stars Gopichand, Jagapati Babu, Anushka Shetty and music is composed by Mani Sharma. It was later remade in Tamil as Maanja Velu, in Bengali as Fighter, and twice in  Bangladesh as Darowaner Chele and Jaan Kurbaan and in Kannada as Varadhanayaka. The film won two Nandi Awards and one Filmfare Award.

Plot
The film begins with Indu a plucky naughty girl fleeing from her enforced nuptial while she is chased by a cop DIG Hari Narayan. Besides, a valiant Chandu absconds from the police prison by smashing them. The two reach the outskirts where shockingly Chandu hits Hari Narayan and the story moves rearward. A couple of months ago ACP Bose a stout-hearted cop newly deputed to the city. Here, he encounters a notorious Shankar that acts the crimes & settlements utilizing the sections in law and skips from a sentence. Therefore, he is famed as Section Shankar. Bose leads a jollity life with his parents, wife, daughter Pinky, and younger brother Chandu. Once, Indu is acquainted with Bose's family and nears them but she is unbeknownst of Chandu. Destiny makes them collegians and their cognizance of squabbles. After a series of donnybrooks, Indu is aware of the actuality and they fall in love.

Meanwhile, Shankar illegally harvests  of loan from Good Luck Bank by entrapping the chairman with aid of his associate DIG Hari Narayan. However, Bose destroys his domain day by day, and as the balloon goes up the chairman pressures him to recoup the loan. As a result, the chairman is assassinated technically by Shankar's sidekick Shafi the bestie of Chandu that forges as upright. Shafi lusts for Indu for a long time and he requests Shankar for her in turn. Accordingly, Shankar forcibly takes Indu on the day of his idol's inauguration. Anyhow, Chandu safeguards her by crushing him and his idol. Later, Indu invites Chandu to her hometown for her cousin's wedding. Being conscious of it, Shankar ploy and instruct Shafi to be behind him along with his men. Whereupon, Shankar's men onslaught on Chandu and wounds him. Since he is ignorant of Shafi's diabolic shade, he asks him to get away with Indu from that place. Abstractedly, Indu moves with Shafi and he seizes her.

Simultaneously, Bose uncovers the chairman's death as murder, and the bank seals down when the victims crumble & revolt. Bose succeeds in catching of Manager and secretly hides him to recover every penny of depositors. Now, Shankar & DIG are under anxiety as their names may come out but incapable of detecting his whereabouts. Then, they tactically find out Bose's location is at the general hospital via Shafi, and 3 of them land therein, backstab Bose, and slay the Manager. Fortuitously, Chandu who is recovering at the same place spots his brother at death's door and backs the knaves. Furthermore, DIG poses Bose as an outlaw before the media that has vanished with the depositors' amount by killing the manager. Bearing this in mind, the public conducts riots where Shankar's men taking Bose struck. So, they frame him in a scary toy thrown into a burning bus. Chandu perceives it, as some drops of Bose's blood falling on him and efforts to protect his brother but in vain. Bose leaves his breath in Chandu's lap letting him a locket. At the same time, his wife gives birth to a baby boy when Chandu thresholds his pain and hides Bose's expiry.

Forthwith, Chandu discovers the locket is owned by Shafi and blows up on his home where he relieves captured Indu. After getting complete knowledge of his brother's murder, eliminates Shafi on behalf of Bose and also warns the remaining. Frightened, Shankar & DIG, confirm that bose is still alive viewing the CCTV footage on the day of the protest. The next day, Chandu with Indu hatch a plan to lure the DIG to a highway. Yet suddenly, Chandu is hauled by DIG into custody. Plus, abruptly Indu's father fixes her espousal, wherefrom, she escapes which is shown prior. Presently, a new DIG Ajay Prakash a rectitude takes charge and announces apprehend of Bose. As a result, Bose's family & people strike before the DIG office allowing them to see Bose when they notify his flight risk. In that chaos, Shankar catches hold of Bose's family and threatens Chandu to get Bose out. Thus, Chandu in tears bursts out, divulges the actuality, and is about to slaughter Shankar. Just as, Ajay Prakash arrives and Shankar strives to counterfeit him. On this, Ajay proclaims that he knows all because of his wisdom toward Bose's sincerity and seeks Chandu to finish off Shankar. At last, Chandu ceases him after winning back a total of depositors. Finally, the movie ends with all maintaining Bose alive forever to act beyond the law.

Cast

 Gopichand as Chandu
 Jagapati Babu as ACP Bose
 Anushka Shetty as Indu
 Yashpal Sharma as Section Shankar 
 Amit Tiwari as Shafi
 Ashish Vidyarthi as DIG Ajay Prakash 
 Devraj as DIG Hari Narayan
 Kota Srinivasa Rao as Chandu and Bose's father
 Kalyani as Bose's wife
 Brahmanandam as Restaurant Owner
 Ali as Bokkana
 Venu Madhav as Venu
 Ahuti Prasad as Indu's father
 Surya as Bank Manager
 Raghu Babu as Shankar's henchman
 Ravi Babu as Pawan
 Chalapathi Rao as Pawan's father
 Srinivasa Reddy as Pawan's friend
 Pragathi 
 Dharmavarapu Subramanyam as police officer supporting Chandu and Bose
 Shankar Melkote
 Chittajalu Lakshmipati as Indu's father's assistant
 Fish Venkat
 Giridhar 
 Chitti 
 Vijaya Singh 
 Padma Jayanthi 
 Revathi 
 Nandini 
 Ramya 
 Kavya 
 Vinitha Rao
 Baby Kalvi Mitra as Pinky

Soundtrack

Music composed by Mani Sharma. Music released on ADITYA Music Company.

Box office
Anushka's popularity increased because of her performance role in the film and it was declared a Super Hit at the box office.

Awards
Nandi Awards - 2007
 Third Best Feature Film - Bronze - Nallamalupu Bujji
 Best Supporting Actor - Jagapati Babu

Filmfare Awards South
 Filmfare Award for Best Supporting Actor – Telugu - Jagapati Babu

References

External links
 

2007 films
Telugu films remade in other languages
Indian action films
2000s masala films
2000s Telugu-language films
Films scored by Mani Sharma
2007 directorial debut films
Films directed by Sriwass
2007 action films